John Martin McQuilten (10 November 1949 – 2 January 2015) was an Australian politician.

Born in Sunshine, Victoria, he attended public schools at Aberfeldie and Essendon before becoming a vigneron and business consultant. He was an executive of the Victorian Soft Drink Association and Vice-President of the Pyrenees Vignerons. In 1999, he was elected to the Victorian Legislative Council as a Labor MLC for Ballarat Province. He served until 2006, when electoral reforms meant that he could not be found a seat.

References

1949 births
2015 deaths
Australian Labor Party members of the Parliament of Victoria
Members of the Victorian Legislative Council
21st-century Australian politicians
People from Sunshine, Victoria
20th-century Australian businesspeople
Businesspeople from Melbourne
Politicians from Melbourne